Emmanuel Mission High School is a missionary school situated in Siwan district of Bihar. It is affiliated to CBSE (10+2).  It is the head branch of Emmanuel Convent School in Anand Nagar in Siwan. The school was founded by E.A. Abraham in 2000.

Location
Emmanuel Mission High School is situated in Emmanuel Nagar, in the Siwan district of Bihar.

Structure and facilities
It has four-storey building along with church and junior section. Each floor has 6-7 rooms, and each room is naturally ventilated via four large windows. A computer lab with internet facilities, an underground library, and science labs are provided. Several classrooms are fitted with Smartclass facilities. It has a large playground with a basketball court. For junior sections, the playing ground has different game facilities.

External links
http://emmanuel.co.in

High schools and secondary schools in Bihar
Christian schools in Bihar
2000 establishments in Bihar
Educational institutions established in 2000